Khadija is a given name, the name of Khadija bint Khuwaylid, first wife of Muhammad.

It may also refer to:

People

Historical figures
Hatice Sultan (daughter of Selim I), Ottoman princess, daughter of Sultan Selim I and Hafsa Sultan. Sister of Sultan Suleiman the Magnificent.
Hatice Sultan (daughter of Mehmed IV) (1660–1743), Ottoman princess
Hatice Sultan (daughter of Ahmed III), (1710–1738) 18th-century Ottoman princess
Hatice Sultan (daughter of Mustafa III) (1768–1822), Ottoman princess
Hatice Sultan (daughter of Murad V) (1870–1938), Ottoman princess
Mahfiruz Hatice Sultan (1590–1607/10), mother of Ottoman Sultan Osman II
Khadija Sultana (1600– fl. 1665), Indian regent
Turhan Hatice Sultan (1627–1683), mother of Ottoman Sultan Mehmed IV
Hatice Muazzez Sultan (1629–1687), mother of Ottoman Sultan Ahmed II
Khadijah of the Maldives, Sultana of the Maldives from 1347 to 1380
Turhan Hatice Sultan, concubine of Ottoman Sultan Ibrahim I
Hatice Muazzez, Polish Jewish wife of Ottoman Sultan Ibrahim I
Khadija Gayibova, Azerbaijani pianist (1893–1938)

Living people
Khadija Abbouda (born 1968), Moroccan athlete
Khadija Ahrari, Afghan politician
Khadija al-Salami (born 1966), Yemeni film producer
Khadija Amin, Bangladesh Nationalist Party politician and Member of Parliament
Khadija Arib (born 1960), Dutch politician
Khadijah Farrakhan, wife of Louis Farrakhan
Khadijah Hashim (born 1942), Malaysian journalist and teacher
Khadija Ismayilova, Azerbaijani journalist
Khadija Lalla, (born 2007) Moroccan princess
Khadija Mumtaz (born 1955), Malayalam-language writer
Khadija Mushtaq, Pakistani academic administrator and educator
Khadija Qalanjo, Somali singer and dancer
Khadija Salum Ally Al-Qassmy (born 1958), Tanzanian politician
Khadija Shaw (born 1997), Jamaican footballer
Khadeeja (actress) (died 2017), Malayalam-language film actress
Khadijah Whittington (born 1986), American basketball player

Fictional people
Khadijah James, character in the television series Living Single

Buildings
Khadija Mosque

Films
Khadeeja, Malayalam-language film

Places
Lalla Khedidja, a mountain in the Djurdjura Range of Algeria (also known as Tamgut Aâlayen or Azeru Amghur in Taqbaylit)